Larry Grenadier (born February 6, 1966 in San Francisco) is an American jazz double bassist.

Early life
Grenadier's father, Albert, was a trumpet player, and his two brothers, Phil and Steve, play trumpet and guitar, respectively. Grenadier began on trumpet when he was 10 years old before beginning to play the bass the following year. Grenadier's father helped introduce him to the instruments and music theory. Larry's older brother Phil began listening to jazz around this time, influencing his sibling's musical interests. Grenadier began listening to several jazz bassists including Ray Brown, Charles Mingus, Richard Davis, Paul Chambers, Wilbur Ware and Oscar Pettiford, among others.

At age 12 Grenadier began formal study of the acoustic bass, learning from local jazz bass players Chris Poehlor, Paul Breslin, and Frank Tusa and later classical bassists Michael Burr and Stephen Tramontozzi. At 16, Grenadier had a busy career playing in the San Francisco Bay Area with both local musicians and those traveling through town in need of a bass player. These musicians included Harvey Wainapel, Bobby Hutcherson, Joe Henderson, Larry Vuckovitch, Eddie Henderson, Bruce Forman, Eddie Marshall, Vince Lateano, George Cables and Donald Bailey, Toots Thielmans, Johnny Griffin, Charles McPherson and Frank Morgan, among others.

Grenadier studied at Stanford University and graduated in 1989 with a bachelor's degree in English Literature. At Stanford, he met Stan Getz, with whom he toured.

Career

After graduating from Stanford, Grenadier moved to Boston to play with vibraphonist Gary Burton. In 1991, he moved to New York. He continued to collaborate with some of the musicians he had met during his time in Boston, such as Kurt Rosenwinkel, Joshua Redman, Mark Turner, Jorge Rossy, and Chris Cheek. Others he met for the first time in New York include Bill Stewart, Kevin Hays, Renee Rosnes, Ralph Moore, Billy Drummond, Danilo Perez, David Sánchez, Tom Harrell and Billy Hart. Grenadier continued his association with Joe Henderson, touring with his band which at times included Al Foster, Renee Rosnes and Larry Willis. He also spent a few months during his earlier years in New York playing in Betty Carter's band.

In the early 1990s, Grenadier first met and played with pianist Brad Mehldau. He joined Mehldau's Trio with drummer Jorge Rossy; together they toured and recorded for more than ten years. Rossy was replaced by drummer Jeff Ballard in 2004.

Grenadier has worked with guitarist Pat Metheny, with whom he toured as a trio along with drummer Bill Stewart. He credits his experiences touring with Metheny's trio as a significant learning experience.

Grenadier has also played with John Scofield, Hudson (a collaborative project with Jack DeJohnette, John Medeski and John Scofield),  Charles Lloyd, Chris Potter, Billy Higgins, Michael Brecker, and Paul Motian, among many others.

Grenadier is a member of FLY, a trio which includes drummer Jeff Ballard and tenor saxophonist Mark Turner. They have recorded three critically acclaimed albums. He also tours and records with his wife, singer-songwriter Rebecca Martin. A landmark solo bass album The Gleaners was issued by the ECM label in 2019.

Grenadier lives with Rebecca and their son Charlie James in the Hudson Valley, north of New York City.

Gallery

Selected discography

As leader
 The Gleaners (ECM, 2019)
With BeatleJazz
 With a Little Help From Our Friends (Lightyear, 2005)
 All You Need is Love (Lightyear, 2007)
With Peter Beets
 New York Trio – Page Two (Criss Cross, 2002)
With Peter Bernstein
 Heart's Content (Criss Cross, 2002)
 Stranger in Paradise (Venus, 2004)
With Seamus Blake
 The Call (Criss Cross, 1993)
 Four Track Mind (Criss Cross, 1994)
With Chris Cheek
 Blues Cruise (Fresh Sound, 2005)
With George Colligan
 The Endless Mysteries (Origin, 2013)
With Fly
 Fly (Savory, 2004)
 Sky & Country (ECM, 2009)
 Year of the Snake (ECM, 2012)
With Jon Gordon
 Ask Me Now (Criss Cross, 1994)
 Currents (Double-Time, 1998)
With Phil Grenadier
 Sweet Transients (Fresh Sound New Talent, 2000)
 Playful Intentions (Fresh Sound New Talent, 2002)
With Kevin Hays
 Ugly Beauty (SteepleChase, 1991)
With Hudson (Jack DeJohnette, John Scofield, John Medeski, and Larry Grenadier)
 Hudson (Motéma, 2013)
With Ethan Iverson
 Costumes Are Mandatory (HighNote, 2013)
 Every Note Is True (Blue Note, 2022)
With David Kikoski
 Details (Criss Cross, 2003)
 Limits (Criss Cross, 2005)
With Jonathan Kreisberg
 Nine Stories Wide (Criss Cross, 2003)
With Charles Lloyd
 The Water Is Wide (ECM, 1999)
 Hyperion with Higgins (ECM, 1999)
 Lift Every Voice (ECM, 2002)
With Herbie Mann
 America/Brasil (Lightyear, 1995)
 Celebration (Lightyear, 1995)
With Brad Mehldau
 Introducing Brad Mehldau (Warner Bros., 1995)
 The Art of the Trio Volume One (Warner Bros., 1997)
 Live at the Village Vanguard: The Art of the Trio Volume Two (Warner Bros., 1998)
 Songs: The Art of the Trio Volume Three (Warner Bros., 1998)
 Art of the Trio 4: Back at the Vanguard (Warner Bros., 1999)
 Places (Warner Bros., 2000)
 Progression: The Art of the Trio, Vol. 5 (Warner Bros., 2001)
 Largo (Warner Bros., 2002)
 Anything Goes (Warner Bros., 2004)
 Day Is Done (Nonesuch, 2005)
 House on Hill (Nonesuch, 2006)
 Brad Mehldau Trio Live (Nonesuch, 2008)
 Highway Rider (Nonesuch, 2009)
 Ode (Nonesuch, 2012)
 Where Do You Start (Nonesuch, 2012)
 Blues and Ballads (Nonesuch, 2016)
 Seymour Reads the Constitution! (Nonesuch, 2018)
With Pat Metheny
 Trio 99 → 00 (Warner Bros., 2000)
 Trio → Live (Warner Bros., 2000)
 Metheny/Mehldau (Nonesuch, 2006)
 Metheny/Mehldau Quartet (Nonesuch, 2007)
With Paul Motian
 Trio 2000 + One (Winter & Winter 1997)
 On Broadway Vol. 4 or The Paradox of Continuity (Winter & Winter, 2005)
 Live at the Village Vanguard (Winter & Winter, 2006)
 Live at the Village Vanguard Vol. II (Winter & Winter, 2006)
 Live at the Village Vanguard Vol. III (Winter & Winter, 2006)
With Rebecca Martin
 Thoroughfare (Sunnyside, 1998)
 Middlehope (Fresh Sound, 2000)
 The Growing Season (Sunnyside, 2008)
 When I Was Long Ago (Sunnyside, 2010)
 Twain (Sunnyside, 2013)
The Upstate Project (Sunnyside, 2017)
With MTB
 Consenting Adults (Criss Cross, 1994)
With Wolfgang Muthspiel
 Rising Grace (ECM, 2016)
 Where the River Goes (ECM, 2018)
With Chris Potter
 Pure (Concord, 1994)
 Moving In (Concord, 1996)
 The Sirens (ECM, 2013) with Craig Taborn, David Virelles and Eric Harland
With Enrico Rava
 New York Days (ECM, 2008)
With Joshua Redman
 Timeless Tales (Warner Bros., 1998)
 Back East (Nonesuch, 2007)
 Compass (Nonesuch, 2009)
 Walking Shadows (Nonesuch, 2013)
With Kurt Rosenwinkel
 Deep Song (Verve, 2005)
With Jamie Saft
 Borscht Belt Studies (Tzadik, 2011)
 Fight Against Babylon (Veal, 2011) New Zion Trio
With David Sánchez
 Sketches of Dreams (Columbia, 1994)
With Stan Sulzmann
 The Jigsaw (Basho, 2004)
With Mark Turner
Two Tenor Ballads (Criss Cross Jazz, 1994 [2000]) with Tad Shull
 Yam Yam (Criss Cross, 1994)
 In This World (Warner Bros., 1998)
With Scott Wendholt
 From Now On (Criss Cross, 1995)
With Steve Wilson
 Four for Time (Criss Cross, 1994)
With Frank Wess and Johnny Coles
Two at the Top (Uptown, 1988 [2012]) 
With Chihiro Yamanaka
 When October Goes (Atelier Sawano, 2002)
 Madrigal (Atelier Sawano, 2004)
 Lach Doch Mal (Verve, 2006)
 Reminiscence (Verve, 2011)

References

1966 births
Living people
American jazz double-bassists
Male double-bassists
21st-century double-bassists
21st-century American male musicians
American male jazz musicians
Vital Information members
Fly (band) members
Motéma Music artists
ECM Records artists